Rowshandeh or Rowshan Deh may refer to:
 Rowshandeh, Rezvanshahr
 Rowshan Deh, Pareh Sar, Rezvanshahr County